As part of their 1992 tour of Europe, the Australia national rugby union team played 13 matches in Ireland and Wales. The ninth match was played against Welsh club side Llanelli RFC on 14 November 1992 at Stradey Park, Llanelli. The hosts won the match 13–9 thanks to a first-half try from wing Ieuan Evans, converted by Colin Stephens, who added two drop goals in the second half. All of Australia's points came from penalties kicked by Marty Roebuck.

Match details

References

Llanelli 1992
Australia 1992
1992–93 in Welsh rugby union
1992 in Wales
November 1992 sports events in the United Kingdom